A cothon is an artificial, protected inner harbour such as that in Carthage during the Punic Wars  200 BCE.

Cothons were generally found in the Phoenician world. Other examples include Motya in Sicily from the 6th century BC, which performed an uncertain purpose, (measuring 35 metres x 51 metres), although it has been suggested this cothon might even have been closable and drainable to form a dry dock, Mahdia in Tunisia from the 7th century BC, (which measured 72 metres x 56 metres) and one from Kition in Cyprus.

In ancient times "cothon" was only used to describe the harbour at Carthage. In modern times, however, archaeologists use the term to refer to similar ancient harbours constructed of a man-made basin connected to the sea by a channel. The name comes from an island in Carthage's harbour.

The harbours of Carthage
The cothon at Carthage was divided into a rectangular merchant harbour followed by an inner protected harbour reserved for military use only.  This inner harbour was circular and surrounded by an outer ring of structures divided into a series of docking bays for ship maintenance, along with an island structure at its centre that also housed navy ships.  Each individual docking bay featured a raised slipway.  Above the raised docking bays was a second level consisting of warehouses where oars and rigging were kept along with supplies such as wood and canvas.

On the island structure there existed a raised 'cabin' where the admiral in command could observe the whole harbour along with the surrounding sea.  Altogether the inner docking complex could house up to 220 ships.  The entire harbour was protected by an outer wall and the main entrance could be closed off with iron chains. Most records of Carthage were burnt, because Rome attacked them in the third punic war.

References

Ports and harbours